Niphoparmena spinipennis is a species of beetle in the family Cerambycidae. It was described by Stephan von Breuning in 1939.

It is 8 mm long and 2⅔ mm wide, and its type locality is East Africa.

References

spinipennis
Beetles described in 1939
Taxa named by Stephan von Breuning (entomologist)